AE Giannena is a football club based in Ioannina, Greece.  It was founded in 2004. The club was the winner of 5th Group of Delta Ethniki in 2005 and was promoted to Gamma Ethniki for first time in its history. AE Giannena remained two seasons in Gamma Ethniki and since then the club relegated to the local divisions.

Stadium and facilities
AE Giannena normally plays in Panepirotan National Athletic Center but the team use Zosimades, the main stadium in Ioannina.

Honours
 Delta Ethniki: 2005

External links
Official Website

Ioannina
Football clubs in Epirus
Football clubs in Greece
Multi-sport clubs in Greece
Association football clubs established in 2004
2004 establishments in Greece